Victoria Marie Calvert (née Stubbs, born 1981) is an American lawyer from Georgia who is a United States district judge of the United States District Court for the Northern District of Georgia.

Early life 
Calvert was born Victoria Marie Stubbs, the daughter of Eddie and Sherrie Stubbs. Her surname changed after her father died when she was five years old.

Calvert earned a Bachelor of Arts from Duke University in 2003 and a Juris Doctor from the New York University School of Law in 2006.

Career 

From 2006 to 2012, Calvert was an associate at King & Spalding in Atlanta, where she represented clients in the Special Matters and Government Investigations group. From 2012 to 2022, she was a staff attorney in the federal public defender program in Atlanta.

Notable cases 

Calvert was part of the legal team for Nicholas Bryant, who challenged the death sentence he received for murder during an armed robbery. The Georgia Supreme Court reversed his death sentence.  

In 2020, Calvert unsuccessfully challenged her client Titus Bates's conviction for shooting a U.S. Marshals Service task force officer who was attempting to serve him with a warrant. Calvert argued that assaulting a police officer with a dangerous weapon did not qualify as a predicate crime of violence.

Federal judicial service 

On September 30, 2021, President Joe Biden nominated Calvert to serve as a United States district judge of the United States District Court for the Northern District of Georgia. President Biden nominated Calvert to the seat vacated by Judge Thomas W. Thrash Jr., who assumed senior status on May 8, 2021. On December 1, 2021, a hearing on her nomination was held before the Senate Judiciary Committee. On January 3, 2022, her nomination was returned to the President under Rule XXXI, Paragraph 6 of the United States Senate; she was later renominated the same day. On January 20, 2022, her nomination was reported out of committee by a 13–9 vote. On March 16, 2022, the United States Senate invoked cloture on her nomination by a 52–46 vote. On March 22, 2022, her nomination was confirmed by a 50–46 vote. She received her judicial commission on April 5, 2022. She is the second Black female judge on the U.S. District Court for the Northern District of Georgia.

See also 
 List of African-American federal judges
 List of African-American jurists

References

External links 

1981 births
Living people
21st-century American women lawyers
21st-century American judges
21st-century American lawyers
21st-century American women judges
African-American judges
African-American lawyers
Duke University alumni
Judges of the United States District Court for the Northern District of Georgia
New York University School of Law alumni
People from the Bronx
Public defenders
United States district court judges appointed by Joe Biden